Aq Duz or Aqduz may refer to:

Aq Duz, Qazvin
Aqduz, West Azerbaijan